Adam Walsh (December 4, 1901 – January 13, 1985) was an American football player and coach.  He played college football as a center at the University of Notre Dame where he was an All-American and captain of the 1924 team under Knute Rockne.  Walsh then served as the head football coach at Santa Clara University from 1925 to 1928 and at Bowdoin College from 1935 to 1942 and again from 1947 to 1958, compiling a career college football record of 80–85–11.  He also coached the Cleveland / Los Angeles Rams of the National Football League (NFL) in 1945 and 1946, tallying a mark of 15–5–1.  Walsh was inducted into the College Football Hall of Fame as a player in 1968.

Playing career
Walsh was an outstanding athlete at Hollywood High School in Los Angeles, and earned varsity letters in basketball, track, and football at the University of Notre Dame.  Walsh was an All-American center and captain of the 1924 Notre Dame football team under head coach Knute Rockne.  Walsh anchored the team's offensive line, dubbed the "Seven Mules," who blocked for the famed "Four Horsemen" backfield.  The 1924 team completed an undefeated season with a win over Stanford in the Rose Bowl.
Walsh played every minute of the game against Army in 1924 with two broken hands, never missed a single snap of the ball, was involved in 75 percent of the tackles on defense, and intercepted a pass in the final minutes of the game to preserve a Notre Dame victory.  He remains the offensive center on the All-time Notre Dame Team.

Coaching career
Walsh served as head football coach and athletic director at Santa Clara University from 1925 to 1928.  He then spent five seasons as the line coach at Yale University, and one season at Harvard University in the same capacity.  In 1935, Walsh accepted the head coaching position at Bowdoin College in Brunswick, Maine.  Though Bowdoin had been winless the prior year, Walsh began his 20-year coaching career at the college with a state championship.  His teams won or tied for the Maine championship in seven of his first eight years at Bowdoin.

Bowdoin suspended their football program in 1943 with the onset of World War II.  In 1944, Walsh returned to Notre Dame as a line coach for a season.  In 1945, he led the Cleveland Rams to the NFL Championship and coached the team the next season after a move to Los Angeles.  He returned to Bowdoin after two years with the Rams and a 15–5–1 coaching record in the NFL.  Between 1947 and 1958, Walsh's Bowdoin teams won outright or shared the Maine state championship four more times.

Later life and honors
After retiring from coaching, Walsh served two terms in the Maine House of Representatives, representing Brunswick as a Democrat and was appointed the U.S. Marshal for Maine under Presidents Kennedy and Johnson.

Walsh was inducted into the College Football Hall of Fame in 1968, the Helms Hall of Fame, and the Maine Sports Hall of Fame in 1976.  He was also named to the All-Time Southern California High School Team, the All-time Notre Dame Team, and the All-time Rose Bowl Team.

Head coaching record

College

NFL

References

External links
 
 

1901 births
1985 deaths
20th-century American politicians
American football centers
Bowdoin Polar Bears football coaches
Cleveland Rams coaches
Harvard Crimson football coaches
Los Angeles Rams coaches
Notre Dame Fighting Irish football coaches
Notre Dame Fighting Irish football players
Santa Clara Broncos football coaches
Santa Clara Broncos athletic directors
Yale Bulldogs football coaches
Bowdoin College faculty
Democratic Party members of the Maine House of Representatives
United States Marshals
College Football Hall of Fame inductees
Politicians from Brunswick, Maine
People from Warren County, Iowa
Coaches of American football from California
Players of American football from Iowa
Players of American football from Los Angeles
Sports coaches from Los Angeles
Cleveland Rams head coaches
Los Angeles Rams head coaches